Eschenbach Abbey is a community of Cistercian nuns in Eschenbach in Lucerne, Switzerland. The abbey was founded in about 1290 for Augustinian nuns, and became Cistercian in 1588.

History 
The abbey was founded by Baron Walther III von Eschenbach in about 1290 in Niedereschenbach in the present municipality of Inwil. The chapel of St. Catherine in Niedereschenbach still marks the location of the first nunnery, which was for a community of Augustinian nuns. In 1309  the abbey moved from Niedereschenbach to its present site in Obereschenbach. In 1588 the nuns joined the Cistercian Order, and from then on lived according to the Rule of St Benedict. 

In 1612 the guest house was built. In 1625 the foundation stone was laid of the new abbey church, 24 cells, the cloister and the chapter house. In 1683 the guest house was refurbished and extended, and the famous sundial was installed, the largest in Switzerland. In 1910, when the parish of Eschenbach built a new parish church separate from that of the abbey, which up to then had been shared by both, the community also decided to build a new abbey church (designed in Baroque revival style by the architect August Hardegger), which was dedicated in the same year.

References

Further reading 
 Franz Gross-Weltert and Lothar Emanuel Kaiser: Eschenbach/Luzern. Zisterzienserinnenkloster und Pfarrkirche, Emmenbrücke 2010
 Hanspeter Marti: Die Zisterzienserinnenabtei Eschenbach von den Anfängen bis zur Gegenwart. In: Cistercienser Chronik 126 (2019), pp.17–39 [historiographical outline of the state of research]

External links 
 Pastoralraum Oberseetal - Eschenbach parish

Cistercian nunneries in Switzerland
Cultural property of national significance in the canton of Lucerne
Buildings and structures in the canton of Lucerne